The 2014 Bank of Communications OTO Shanghai Masters was a professional ranking snooker tournament that took place between 8–14 September 2014 at the Shanghai Grand Stage in Shanghai, China. It was the third ranking event of the 2014/2015 season.

Ding Junhui was the defending champion, but he lost 4–6 against Stuart Bingham in the semi-finals.

Bingham won his second ranking title by defeating Mark Allen 10–3 in the final.

Prize fund
The breakdown of prize money for this year is shown below:

 Winner: £85,000
 Runner-up: £35,000
 Semi-final: £19,500
 Quarter-final: £12,000
 Last 16: £8,000
 Last 32: £6,000
 Last 48: £2,500
 Last 64: £1,750
 Last 96: £400

 Non-televised highest break: £200
 Televised highest break: £2,000
 Total: £450,000

Wildcard round
These matches were played in Shanghai on 8 and 9 September 2014.

Main draw

Final

Qualifying
These matches were held between 12 and 15 August 2014 at the Barnsley Metrodome in Barnsley, England.

Century breaks

Qualifying stage centuries

 142  Kurt Maflin
 140  Matthew Selt
 139  Jak Jones
 136  David Morris
 136  Jimmy Robertson
 129, 108, 102  Stuart Carrington
 128, 110  Michael White
 125  Cao Yupeng
 123, 120, 111  Dominic Dale
 121  Rory McLeod
 120  Alan McManus
 119  Noppon Saengkham
 117  Robin Hull
 112, 108  Michael Wasley

 112  Kyren Wilson
 112  Li Hang
 111  Xiao Guodong
 110  Alex Davies
 110  Jamie Cope
 107, 105  Matthew Selt
 106  Tian Pengfei
 103  Gerard Greene
 102  Andrew Higginson
 101  Joe Swail
 101  Ian Burns
 100  Thepchaiya Un-Nooh
 100  Jack Lisowski

Televised stage centuries

 144  Barry Hawkins
 141, 136, 102  Li Hang
 139  Ronnie O'Sullivan
 128, 104  Michael White
 128, 101  Ding Junhui
 121, 102  Shaun Murphy
 118, 114, 103  Stuart Bingham
 117  Marco Fu
 116  Mark Selby

 115  Mark Allen
 114  Huang Jiahao
 114  Zhao Xintong
 106  Chen Zifan
 105  Martin Gould
 103, 102  Dominic Dale
 102  Ryan Day
 100  Judd Trump

References

External links
 2014 Bank of Communications OTO Shanghai Masters – Pictures by Tai Chengzhe at Facebook

2014
2014 in snooker
Shanghai Masters (snooker)